Levitan is a surname. Notable people with the surname include:

 Avri Levitan (born 1973), Israeli violist
 Boris Levitan (1914–2004), Soviet-American mathematician
 Dan Levitan, American businessman
 Félix Lévitan (1911–2007), Tour de France organiser
 Isaac Levitan (1860–1900), Russian painter
 Israel Levitan (1912–1982), American abstract expressionist sculptor
 Jerry Levitan (born 1954), Canadian known as "the kid who interviewed John Lennon"
 Nadav Levitan (1945–2010), Israeli film director, screenwriter, writer and songwriter
 Richard M. Levitan, American emergency medicine physician and businessperson
 Solomon Levitan (1862–1940), treasurer of Wisconsin
 Steven Levitan (born 1962), director
 Tina Levitan (1922–2014), American writer
 Yuliya Levitan (born 1973), American chess player
 Yuri Levitan (1914–1983), Soviet radio announcer

Levite surnames
Jewish surnames